In music, Op. 133 stands for Opus number 133. Compositions that are assigned this number include:

 Beethoven – Grosse Fuge
 Prokofiev – Piano Concerto No. 6
 Schumann – Gesänge der Frühe
 Shostakovich – String Quartet No. 12